The Saskatchewan Rugby Union is the provincial administrative body for rugby union in Saskatchewan, Canada.

External links
 SaskRugby

Rugby
Rugby union governing bodies in Canada